Tore Hamsun (6 March 1912 – 10 January 1995) was a Norwegian painter, writer, and publisher born in Hamarøy. He was the son of the Nobel Prize winning novelist Knut Hamsun and actress Marie Hamsun.

At the age of five, his family moved from Hamarøy to Nørholm, a large agricultural property. Like the rest of his three siblings, he showed artistic ability at a young age but was the only one to take up a career in art. In 1933, he began Torstein Torsteinssons painting school and studied at an Art Academy in Munich from 1934 to 1935. Hamsun later completed studies at the Norwegian National Academy of Fine Arts in Oslo and debuted as a painter in 1940. He was remembered for his landscape paintings influenced by French Impressionism. Some of his paintings contained or were based on motifs derived from his father's books.

From 1942 to 1944, Hamsun reluctantly accepted the position as temporary publishing director of Gyldendal Norsk Forlag publishing company after Harald Grieg, a close friend of Tore's father, was arrested in 1941. His father, Knut Hamsun was of the founders and owners of the publishing company. During the Second World War, Hamsun helped Max Tau flee to Norway. At the end of the war, Hamsun was sentenced to nine months jail for membership in the Nasjonal Samling. He was imprisoned for five months.

In 1940, Hamsun published Mein Vater Knut Hamsun (My Father Knut Hamsun) and in 1956, he published a collection of his father's poems. Hamsun had inheritance rights to his father's farm Nørholm but gave it to his brother Arild Hamsun and settled nearby in Nørholmskilen.

Hamsun married pianist Ruth Elisabeth Grung and had three children with her. In 1953, he married painter Marianne Doris Ferring and also had two children.
Tore Hamsun died after a traffic accident in Oslo in 1995 and was buried in the Eide cemetery.

Publications

References

1912 births
1995 deaths
People from Hamarøy
Oslo National Academy of the Arts alumni
Norwegian publishers (people)
Norwegian landscape painters
Norwegian writers
Tore
Norwegian expatriates in Germany
Members of Nasjonal Samling
Norwegian prisoners and detainees
People convicted of treason for Nazi Germany against Norway
Road incident deaths in Norway